Billie D. Harris (October 14, 1922 - July 17, 1944) was a Lieutenant fighter pilot enlisted in the United States Army Air Force assigned to the 355th Fighter Squadron/354th Fighter Group in southeast England during World War II. His plane was shotdown on July 17, 1944, over Les Ventes in the Normandy region in Northern France. He deliberately avoided the town's houses and managed to divert his plane to crash into the forest and lost his life, causing no victims among the villagers.

Biography
Harris was born on October 14, 1922, in Jackson County, Oklahoma. He was married to Peggy Seale Harris on September 22, 1943 before he was assigned with the  354th Fighter Group, 355th Fighter Squadron.

Military service and death
He was assigned to the 355th Fighter Squadron/354th Fighter Group in southeast England. He flies a P-51 Mustang as a bomber support missions into Germany. He was successful in his daily missions across the English channel that earned him two Air Medals and the Distinguished Flying Cross. On his last mission on July 17, 1944, he was flying on a P-47 fighter over the town of Les Ventes when his plane was shotdown. He had managed to avoid crashing his plane into the town area and was able to maneuver to crash the plane into the forest saving the loss of many lives. He was able to maintain the control of his plane and avoid the village.

The French Resistance were the first to get to the aircraft and discovered that Billie Harris was dead. It landed in trees and was cushioned on impact. His body was not immediately recovered because the German soldiers closed in. His ID was stripped by the Germans but he has a patch in his arm that read D.Harris.

Memorial
The Resistance had recovered his body and was carefully buried. along with the other heroes who lost their lives. He was thought to be a Canadian by the town's villagers as they assumed his name was D’Harris and could not clearly identify him as an American soldier as objects to identify him was taken by the Germans. The town of Les Ventes honored him as a hero  as he fought to liberate France  and on his sacrifice for their freedom since his plane crashed.

He was memorialized at Plot D Row 27 Grave 3, Normandy American Cemetery, Colleville-sur-Mer, France.

References

Recipients of the Air Medal
Recipients of the Distinguished Flying Cross (United States)
1922 births
1944 deaths
People from Jackson County, Oklahoma
United States Army Air Forces personnel killed in World War II
United States Army Air Forces pilots of World War II